A by-election for the seat of Cessnock in the New South Wales Legislative Assembly was held on 8 October 1949. The by-election was triggered by the resignation of Jack Baddeley to accept the position of Chairman of the State Coal Mine Authority.

A by-election for the seat of Redfern was held on the same day.

Dates

Results

Jack Baddeley resigned to accept the position of Chairman of the State Coal Mine Authority.

See also
Electoral results for the district of Cessnock
List of New South Wales state by-elections

References

1949 elections in Australia
New South Wales state by-elections
1940s in New South Wales
October 1949 events in Australia